Armanen runes (or Armanen Futharkh) are 18 pseudo-runes, inspired by the historic Younger Futhark runes, invented by Austrian mysticist and Germanic revivalist Guido von List during a state of temporary blindness in 1902, and described in his Das Geheimnis der Runen ("The Secret of the Runes"), published as a periodical article in 1906, and as a standalone publication in 1908. The name seeks to associate the runes with the postulated Armanen, whom von List saw as ancient Aryan priest-kings.  The Armanen runes continue in use today in esotericism and in Germanic neopaganism.

Publication
Von List claimed the pseudo-runes were revealed to him while in an 11-month state of temporary blindness after a cataract operation on both eyes in 1902. 
This vision in 1902 allegedly opened what List referred to as his "inner eye", via which the "Secret of the Runes" was revealed to him. List stated that his Armanen Futharkh were encrypted in the Rúnatal of the Poetic Edda (stanzas 138 to 165 of the Hávamál), with stanzas 147 through 165, where Odin enumerates eighteen wisdoms (with 164 being an interpolation), interpreted as being the "song of the 18 runes". List and many of his followers believed his runes to represent the "primal runes" upon which all historical rune rows were based.  The book was dedicated to his good friend Friedrich Wannieck and in the introduction, before his discussion of the runes, there is a copy of a correspondence between Wannieck and List.
 
Das Geheimnis der Runen was published in Leipzig and Vienna in 1908 by the Guido-von-List-Gesellschaft (Gross-Lichterfelde).
It was also known as GLB 1 of the Guido-List-Bücherei (GLB) series.

The book was also published as a periodical article as "Das Geheimnis der Runen", "Neue Metaphysische Rundschau" [9] 13 (1906), 23-4, 75-87, 104-26.

An English language translation of the book was published in 1988 by Stephen E. Flowers.

List of runes

List's row is based on the Younger Futhark, with the names and sound values mostly close to the Anglo-Saxon Futhorc. The two final runes, Eh and Gibor, added to the Younger Futhark inventory, are taken from Anglo-Saxon Eoh and Gyfu. Apart from the two additional runes, and a displacement of the Man rune from 13th to 15th place, the sequence is identical to that of the Younger Futhark.

List noted in his book, The Secret of the Runes, that the "runic futharkh (= runic ABC) consisted of sixteen symbols in ancient times." He also referred to the Armanen runes as the 'Armanen Futharkh' of which Stephen E. Flowers notes in his 1988 English translation of Lists 1907/08 'Das Geheimnis der Runen', that "The designation 'futharkh' is based on the first seven runes, namely  F U T A R K H (or H) it is for this reason that the proper name is not futhark—as it is generally and incorrectly written—but rather 'futarkh', with the 'h' at the end."

The first sixteen of von List's runes correspond to the sixteen Younger Futharkh runes, with slight modifications in names (and partly mirrored shapes). The two additional runes are loosely inspired by the Anglo-Saxon Futhorc.

 Fa (an inverted Fe) – F
 Ur – U
 Thurs (as Anglo-Saxon Thorn) (also known as 'Dorn') – Th
 Os (a mirrored Younger Futhark As/Oss) – A(O). In Armanic writings, the Othala rune is generally seen as a variation / extension of Os.
 Rit (as Reidh) – R
 Ka (as in Younger Futhark) – K
 Hagal/Hag (as Younger Futhark Hagall) – H
 Nauth/Not (as Younger Futhark Naud) – N
 Is (as in Younger Futhark) – I
 Ar (similar to short-twig Younger Futhark) – A
 Sig/Sol (as Anglo-Saxon Sigel) – S
 Tyr – T
 Bar (as Younger Futhark Bjarkan) – B
 Laf (as Younger Futhark Logr) – L
 Man (as Younger Futhark Madr); – M
 Yr (as in Younger Futhark, but with a sound value [i]) – Y
 Eh (the name is from Anglo-Saxon Futhork, the shape like Younger Futhark Ar) – E
 Gibor/Ge/Gi (the name similar to Anglo-Saxon Futhork Gyfu) – G

Gibor rune

There is no historical runic equivalent to the 18th rune, the "gibor rune" (the name may be based on the Anglo-Saxon Gyfu rune). 

Its shape is similar to that of the Wolfsangel symbol, which sometimes leads to the mistaken conclusion that the Wolfsangel is linked to the ancient runic alphabet.

List associated his Gibor rune with the final stanza of the Rúnatal (stanza 165 of the Hávamál, trans. H. A. Bellows):
An eighteenth I know, / that ne'er will I tell
To maiden or wife of man,  [lacuna]
The best is what none / but one's self doth know

Connection to völkisch ideology

List's book is seminal to later currents of Germanic mysticism and Nazi occultism.
The Armanen runes were employed for magical purposes in works by authors such as Friedrich Bernhard Marby and Siegfried Adolf Kummer, and after World War II in a reformed "pansophical" system by Karl Spiesberger.
More recently, Stephen Flowers, Adolf Schleipfer, Larry E. Camp and others also build on List's system. 
The book also remains popular in German Neo-Nazism, with a reprint published by Adolf Schleipfer of the "Armanen-Orden".

During the 19th century, interest in the runic alphabets (such as the academic discipline of runology) was revived in Germany by the völkisch movement, which promoted interest in Germanic folklore and language in a reaction against the rapid modernisation of the German Empire under Kaiser Wilhelm I. The collapse of Wilhelmine Germany at the end of the First World War led to an upsurge of interest in völkisch ideology, which rejected liberalism, democracy, socialism and industrial capitalism—all traits reflected in the political system of Weimar Germany—as "un-German" and inspired by subversive Jewish influences.

By the end of the war (1918) there were about seventy-five völkisch groups in Germany, promoting a variety of pseudo-historical, mystical, racial and anti-semitic views. This had a major influence on the embryonic Nazi Party; Hitler wrote in his 1925 book Mein Kampf that "the basic ideas of the National Socialist movement are völkisch and the völkisch ideas are National Socialist."

List's work led to the adoption of his "Armanen runes" by the Völkisch movement, which had already adopted the swastika as a symbol of Germanic antiquity, and from there List's runes became an integral part of German and Austrian nationalistic socialist symbology.
Heinrich Himmler, who led the SS from 1929 to 1945, was one of many leading Nazi figures associated with the Thule Society völkisch group, and his interest in Germanic mysticism led him to adopt a variety of List's runes for the SS. Some had already been adopted by members of the SS and its predecessor organisations but Himmler systematised their use throughout the SS.  By 1945 the SS used the swastika and the Sonnenrad. Until 1939, members of the Allgemeine SS were given training in runic symbolism on joining the organisation.

Runic signs were used from the 1920s to 1945 on SS flags, uniforms and other items as symbols of various aspects of Nazi ideology and Germanic mysticism. They also represented virtues seen as desirable in SS members, and were based on The Runes order designed by Karl Maria Wiligut which he loosely based on the historical runic alphabets.

Use in contemporary esotericism

After World War II, Karl Spiesberger reformed the system, removing the racist aspects of the Listian, Marbyan and Kummerian rune work and placing the whole system in a "pansophical", or eclectic, context. In recent times Karl Hans Welz, Stephen E. Flowers, A. D. Mercer, Larry E. Camp and Victor Ordell L. Kasen have all furthered the effort to remove any racist connotations previously espoused by pre-war Armanen rune masters.

In German-speaking countries, the Armanen Runes have been influential among rune-occultists. According to Stephen E. Flowers they are better known even than the historical Elder Futhark:

The personal force of List and that of his extensive and influential Armanen Orden was able to shape the runic theories of German magicians...from that time to the present day. [...] the Armanen system of runes...by 1955 had become almost "traditional" in German circles

The Armanen runes also have a significant impact in English language occultist literature.

See also
Rudolf John Gorsleben
Siegfried Adolf Kummer
Jörg Lanz von Liebenfels
Runic divination
Peryt Shou
Karl Maria Wiligut
Wiligut runes
Esotericism in Germany and Austria

References

Flowers, Stephen E. 1992. Rune Might: Secret Practices of the German Rune Magicians. 
——— (as Edred Thorsson). 1984. Futhark: A Handbook of Rune Magic. York Beach, Maine: Samuel Weiser, Inc. 
——— (as Edred Thorsson). Runecaster's Handbook, Northern Magic, Runelore.
Goodrick-Clarke, Nicholas. 1993. The Occult Roots of Nazism: Secret Aryan Cults and Their Influence on Nazi Ideology. 
———. 2003. Black Sun: Aryan Cults, Esoteric Nazism, and the Politics of Identity. 
von List, Guido. 1902. Das Geheimnis der Runen. Vienna. (Translated into English by Stephen E. Flowers, 1988, Destiny Books. )
Mercer, A. D. 2015. Runen - Wisdom of the Runes Amsterdam, Aeon Sophia Press,
Pennick, Nigel. 1992. Secrets of the Runes: Discover the Magic of the Ancient Runic Alphabet. 
von Schnurbein, Stefanie. 1992. Religion als Kulturkritik.

External links

Armanen runes by S. Hawkins  
Armanen runes truetype font
online version

Guido von List
Runes in Germanic mysticism
Occultism in Nazism

sv:Runor#Armanenrunorna och ariosofin